"What Happened to That Boy" is a song by American rapper Baby, released as the second single from his debut studio album Birdman (2002), featuring rap duo Clipse.

Critical reception
Paul Wong of The Michigan Daily praised Baby's rapping on "What Happened to That Boy", noting that he "runs the show with his slick southern delivery".

Music video
The music video for "What Happened to That Boy" was directed by Benny Boom and filmed in New Orleans. The entire video had to be recorded twice, following a production error caused by the cinematographer putting the film reel into the camera backwards, meaning that none of the first shoot was captured. Clipse agreed to return to New Orleans for a second shoot, which was this time successful: the video ultimately took a week to produce.

Controversy
"What Happened to That Boy" is rumored throughout the hip-hop community to have sparked the long-running feud between Clipse and Cash Money Records, although the artists involved have not confirmed this publicly. According to Hot 97 hip-hop DJ Ebro Darden, The Neptunes never received the payment they were promised from Cash Money for producing "What Happened to That Boy"; as a result, Pharrell Williams is alleged to have refused to work with the label in the future, leading Clipse member Pusha T to repeatedly attack Cash Money artists – mainly Lil Wayne at first, then Drake throughout the 2010s – in his music over the following years, out of loyalty to Williams.

Charts

Weekly charts

Year-end charts

References

2003 singles
Birdman (rapper) songs
Clipse songs
Song recordings produced by the Neptunes
2002 songs
Songs written by Chad Hugo
Songs written by Pusha T
Songs written by Pharrell Williams
Songs written by Birdman (rapper)